Heterogymna cheesmanae is a moth in the Carposinidae family. It was described by John David Bradley in 1962 and is found on the New Hebrides.

References

Arctiidae genus list at Butterflies and Moths of the World of the Natural History Museum

Carposinidae
Moths described in 1962